The Cross-Wits is an American syndicated game show which premiered on December 15, 1975, and lasted for five seasons until its cancellation on September 12, 1980. The show was hosted by Jack Clark, with Jerri Fiala as hostess. Announcing duties were handled by John Harlan, Jay Stewart, and Jerry Bishop. The show was produced by Ralph Edwards Productions and distributed by Metromedia Producers Corporation.

A second version began airing on September 8, 1986, titled The All-New Crosswits, and was hosted by David Sparks with Michelle Roth as announcer. This version was produced by Crossedwits Productions in association with Outlet Communications, Inc., and distributed by ABR Entertainment.

Both versions were produced as daily shows, although the original Cross-Wits aired in many markets as either a once- or twice-weekly series.

Main game
Two teams, each consisting of two celebrities and one contestant, competed to solve clues to crossword puzzles. Each word in the puzzle was also a clue to a master puzzle.

1975–80 version

The category of the master puzzle was announced at the beginning of each round. The contestant captain of one team chose a word in the puzzle, by number and orientation (across or down), and designated one star to play it. After hearing a clue to the word, the star had seven seconds to guess it; if he/she failed to do, the captain could offer a guess. If the captain also failed to solve the word, control passed to the opposing team.

A correct answer awarded 10 points per letter in the word. The captain could then either choose a word for the other star on his/her team or try to guess the subject of the master puzzle. In the latter case, all three team members were given seven seconds to discuss the puzzle, after which the captain could guess. A correct solution awarded 100 points, while a miss gave control to the opponents. The trailing team at the end of any round had initial control for the next one.

Starting in 1976, contestants won a prize for solving each puzzle in addition to the 100-point bonus. From 1976 to 1979, the category of the master puzzle was not immediately revealed at the start of the first two rounds; any contestant who solved such a puzzle after the first word won a car. The host revealed the category if the puzzle was not solved at this point. In case a car was won in the first round, the category of the puzzle would be revealed for the second round. In 1979, the rules were changed to offer the car only during the second round, with no discussion between the stars and contestant, who was given five seconds to decide on a response. The team who solved the puzzle in the first round began the second one, a change intended to deter teams from deliberately losing the first round in order to have a better chance at winning the car.

The game continued until time was called, and the captain of the leading team won the game. Starting in 1979, a captain whose team scored 1,000 points also won a $1,000 bonus.

This version was taped before the era of computerized graphics and featured a manually operated game board that used back-lit tiles which illuminated to show the letters in each word. Hostess Fiala would use a long pointer to indicate the position of each word on the board, as the numbers on the squares were too small to be seen by home viewers.

1986–87 version
The game was played similarly to the 1975 version with modifications to the scoring format. Each word in the first puzzle scored 5 points per letter and solving the puzzle scored 50 points. These values doubled to 10/100 in the second round, and 20/200 in the third. The gameboard for this version was entirely computer-generated, and its coloration varied depending on the subject of the master puzzle (person, place, or thing).

Crossfire round (both versions)
The contestant with the most points at the end of the game played the Crossfire Round along with his/her choice of celebrity partner (a choice of only the winning player's partners in 1975 and a choice of all four in 1986). The team was shown one last crossword puzzle with ten words, none of which were clues to a master puzzle. The team called out words by number and the host read the clue for that word. If the team could solve all ten words in 60 seconds or less, the contestant won the grand prize.

In the 1975 version, each correct answer won increasingly valuable prizes, and if the contestant solved all ten they won the grand prize, which was usually a car, but sometimes a trip or a fur coat. In the 1986 version, contestants who solved all ten words won a trip and the opportunity to win a car.  Contestants who failed to win the bonus round on the 1986 version won a consolation prize package.

Car round (1986–87 version)
The three celebrities who did not play the Crossfire Round were each given boxes with the name of one of three cars available. After choosing which car to play for, the contestant then chose a celebrity. If the model of the chosen car matched the card in the box held by the chosen celebrity, the contestant won the car. For a time, the fourth celebrity was also a participant in the car round, and a corresponding fourth box was added to the mix; if chosen, it was worth $1,000 to the contestant.

For the first two taped episodes, the car round was staged differently: rather than holding boxes containing the names of the three cars offered, the celebrities held the keys to each of the three cars. After choosing a celebrity, that celebrity attempted to unlock the chosen car's driver's door with his/her key.

Episode status
The original version is intact and held by Ralph Edwards Productions, but has not been rerun since its original airings. The revival was shown on The Family Channel from June 7 to August 27, 1993, and on the now-defunct American Independent Network from 1997 to 1998. On October 26, 2014, cable network GSN aired two episodes of the revived version, both from December 1986 featuring Rosie O'Donnell and Arsenio Hall, respectively.

References

External links
 Video summary of the show, from the Ralph Edwards Productions website
 The Cross-Wits on IMDb
 Crosswits on IMDb

First-run syndicated television programs in the United States
1970s American game shows
1975 American television series debuts
1980 American television series endings
1980s American game shows
1986 American television series debuts
1987 American television series endings
Television series by Ralph Edwards Productions
Television series by Metromedia
English-language television shows
American television series revived after cancellation
Crossword television shows